The Scandinavian diaspora may refer to

Old diaspora

Viking and Old Norse
Scandinavian explorations, conquests, emigrations, and pioneering settlements during the Viking expansion Scrutinising the Viking Age through the lens of settlement offers a distinct perspective, highlighting their cultural profile distinct from their predatory reputation.

Modern diaspora
The term "Scandinavian diaspora" is also used to describe more recent emigrations and emigrants originating in one or more of the countries of Scandinavia.

Swedish diaspora

Swedish diaspora communities include:
 Swedish Americans
 Swedish Argentines
 Swedish Australians
 Swedish Canadians
 Swedish Costa Ricans
 Ural Swedes (Russia)
 Gammalsvenskby (Ukraine)

Finnish diaspora

People emigrated to the United States, Canada, Ghana, Australia, New Zealand, South Africa, Senegal, Sierra Leone, Italy, Ireland, United Kingdom, Sweden, Brazil and Argentina. They have also started Utopian communities in places including Australia, Brazil, Paraguay, France, Cuba, and Sierra Leone.

Finnish diaspora communities include:
 Finnish Americans
 Finnish Argentine
 Finnish Australians
 Finnish Canadians
 Forest Finns (Norway & Sweden)
 Kven people (Norway)
 Ingrian Finns (Russia)
 Sweden Finns
 Tornedalians (Sweden)
 Finns in Switzerland

Danish diaspora

Danish diaspora communities include:
 Danish Americans 
Greenlandic Americans
Faroese Americans
 Danish Argentine
 Danish Australians
 Danish Canadians
 Danish minority of Southern Schleswig (Germany)
 Danish people in Greenland
 Danish New Zealanders

Icelandic diaspora

Icelandic diaspora communities include:
 Icelandic Americans
 Icelandic Australians
 Icelandic Canadians

Norwegian diaspora

Norwegian diaspora communities include:
 Norwegian Americans
 Norwegian Australians
 Norwegian Canadians
 Norwegians in Finland
 Norwegian New Zealanders 
 Kola Norwegians (Russia)
 Norwegian South Africans
 Norwegian diaspora in Denmark
 Norwegian diaspora in Sweden

The first modern Norwegian settlement in the United States was Norwegian Ridge, in what is now Spring Grove, Minnesota.

See also
 Scandinavian Americans
 Scandinavian Australians
 Scandinavian migration to Britain
 Scandinavian Brazilians
 Scandinavian Canadians
 Early Scandinavian Dublin
 Scandinavian Mexicans
 Scandinavian New Zealanders
 Scandinavian Venezuelan

References

European diasporas